Below is a list of people who are known for their association with Faisalabad, Pakistan. It does not necessarily mean that they were born in the city or were even nationals of the country.

Huma Batool, First female chairperson of an airline in Pakistan
Barkat Ali Ludhianwi, Sufi of Pakistan
Sohail Abbas, Famous Announcer Of Radio Pakistan FM.93 People's Colony No.2
Abdullah Ghafoor, Famous Soical Mansoorabad and Architecture Person.
Amjad Saqib, Pakistani social entrepreneur, development practitioner, author and a former civil servant
Rufin Anthony, Roman Catholic priest and bishop
Teji Bachchan, Indian social activist and the late mother of Amitabh Bachchan
Hari Singh Dilbar, Indian writer and poet in the Punjabi language
Jassi Lailpuria, Pakistani singer
Naqsh Lyallpuri, pen name of Jaswant Rai Sharma, Indian ghazal and Bollywood film lyricist
Abrar Ul Haq, Pakistani musician 
Dildar Hussain, tabla player
Lal Chand Yamla Jatt, Indian folk singer
John Joseph, Roman Catholic priest and bishop
Prithviraj Kapoor, Indian actor, director, producer
Arfa Karim, computer prodigy
Muhammad Fazal Karim, Pakistani politician of Sunni Ittehad Council
Farrukh Fateh Ali Khan, Qawwali and ghazal singer
Fateh Ali Khan, Qawwali singer
Iqrar Ahmad Khan, agricultural scientist
Nusrat Fateh Ali Khan, Qawwali singer
Rahat Fateh Ali Khan, Qawwali singer
Rana Muhammad Akram Khan, former chairman of the Punjab Bar Council
Naz Khialvi, lyricist, poet and radio broadcaster
Master Sunder Singh Lyallpuri, Indian independence movement leader, educationist and journalist
Mala, ghazal and playback singer
Khalid Maqbool, lieutenant general and politician
Zia Mohyeddin, artist, actor
Ifti Nasim, poet
Hassan Nisar, columnist and writer
Swarn Noora, Indian Sufi singer; grandmother of the famous Sufi singing duo Nooran Sisters
Resham, Pakistani film actress
Abdul Rauf Rufi, Naat Khawan
Arjan Singh, marshal and only officer of the Indian Air Force to be promoted to five-star rank
Rai Ahmad Khan Kharal Freedom activist
Bhagat Singh, Indian revolutionary socialist
Grahanandan Singh, Indian field hockey player
Tariq Teddy, television actor and stand-up comedian
Nabeel Zafar, television actor and producer fame bulbulay
Sakhawat Naz, television actor and stand-up comedian

Players
Rameez Raja, Pakistani cricketer
Aqeel Ahmed, Pakistani cricketer
Shahbaz Ahmed, Pakistani hockey player
Saeed Ajmal, Pakistani cricketer
Moeen Akhtar, Pakistani cricketer
Naeem Akhtar, Pakistani cricketer
Muhammad Asif, snooker player
Shahid Nazir, Pakistani cricketer
Asif Ali, Pakistani cricketer
Wasim Haider, Pakistani cricketer
Mohammad Talha, Pakistani cricketer
Misbah-ul-Haq, Pakistani cricketer

Politicians 
Rana Asif Tauseef, politician
Rana Zahid Tauseef, politician
Rana Sanaullah Khan, politician 
Malik Muhammad Nawaz, politician
Chaudhry Abid Sher Ali, politician
Muhammad Saleem Bajawa, politician
Shahbaz Bhatti, politician
Khawaja Muhammad Islam, politician
Chaudhry Muhammad Afzal Sahi, son of Chaudhry Nawab Khan Sahi, a famous landlord of Sahianwala
Ghulam Rasool Sahi, politician
Madan Lal Khurana, Former Chief Minister of Delhi
Jagjit Singh Lyallpuri, politician of the Communist Part of India
Sunder Singh Lyallpuri, politician and Indian independence activist

References

Faisalabad
Faisalabad-related lists
Faisalabad